Prawn soup, also referred to as shrimp soup, is a soup dish prepared using freshwater or saltwater prawns as a primary ingredient. Several varieties of the dish exist in various areas of the world, including Penang prawn mee in Malaysia, Peruvian chupe de camarones, Thai kaeng som kung and Mexican caldo de camarones.  Prawn and shrimp soup can be prepared as a broth- or stock-based soup, as a cream-based soup, or as a chowder. In the United States, cream of shrimp soup is mass-produced and distributed canned or frozen.

Varieties by country

Iceland
Rækjusúpa  is a shrimp soup in Icelandic cuisine prepared using shrimp, fish such as haddock, bacon, cream, corn, celery and other ingredients. It has been described as having a sweet and smoky flavor. Frozen shrimp can be used to prepare the dish.

Malaysia

Penang prawn mee, also referred to as har mee, is a prawn soup in Malaysian cuisine, and it is a specialty of Penang, Malaysia. The shells and heads of prawns are typically used to prepare the stock for this soup. Penang prawn mee is a street food in Penang.

Mexico
Caldo de camarones is known in Mexico as a shrimp-only dish. It is a variant of the common dish caldo de siete mares (seven seas soup).

Peru

Chupe de camarones (American English: "shrimp soup") is a common dish in Peru, and is a traditional part of Peruvian cuisine. The basic ingredients in the dish are river prawns, fish, potatoes, eggs, milk, oregano and chili peppers. Freshwater crayfish from rivers are also used to prepare chupe de camarones in Peru. It has been described as having the consistency of a chowder. In July 2016 in Lima, Peru, a resolution was proclaimed by chefs and local owners of picanterías and restaurants for a chupe de camarones week in honor of the dish, which occurred from July 10–16, 2016, in restaurants in Lima, Tacna and Arequipa.

Philippines
Sinigang na hipon is a tamarind-based sour soup served in the Philippines. It is made with shrimps or prawns, onions, water spinach, radishes, tomatoes, and long green chili peppers, and usually seasoned with fish sauce.

Thailand
Kaeng som kung, also referred to as kaeng som or gaeng som, is a soup dish in Thai cuisine that originated in southern Thailand. It is a spicy and sour soup prepared with prawns, vegetables and curry spices.

Tom yum goong (sour prawn soup), also referred to as tom yum and tom yam, is a Thai soup dish. It is a spicy soup prepared with a clear and light broth.

United States

Shrimp chowder is a dish that is prevalent in the Gulf states of the United States. It is prepared in typical chowder fashion, using milk or cream, potatoes, onion, shallots, celery, broth or stock, and shrimp. Additional ingredients are also sometimes used. Shrimp chowder is also prepared in the U.S. state of Maine.

Mass production
Cream of shrimp soup is a mass-produced canned soup product in the United States. The Campbell Soup Company manufactures and markets a condensed cream of shrimp canned soup. Circa the 1960s, the Campbell Soup Company manufactured and marketed a frozen cream of shrimp soup. In addition to being consumed as a soup, prepared cream of shrimp soup can be used as an ingredient in dishes such as seafood meat molds and in crawfish pie.

Gallery

See also

 Fish soup
 Hae mee
 List of shrimp dishes
 List of soups
 List of cream soups
 Shrimp and prawn as food

Notes

References

External links

 Hot and sour prawn soup. BBC Food.
 Thai prawn soup. Lancashire.gov.uk.

Icelandic cuisine
Malaysian soups
Peruvian cuisine
Fish and seafood soups